Mihajlo "Bata" Paskaljević (14 January 1923 – 26 January 2004) was a Serbian stage, film, and television actor, permanent member of the Belgrade Drama Theatre since 1950.

Born in Požarevac (at the time Kingdom of Yugoslavia), he spent his childhood and youth years in Kruševac.

Most of his stage and film career were comic roles. His first dramatic role was that of the father of a protagonist Olgica in the 1987 film Reflections by Goran Marković, for which he received the award for the best male supporting role at  Niš Film Festival.

He died in Belgrade, Serbia and Montenegro.

References

1923 births
2004 deaths
People from Požarevac
Serbian male film actors
Serbian male stage actors
Serbian male television actors
Serbian people of Greek descent
Yugoslav people of Greek descent